Nana Ekvtimishvili (born 9. July 1978 in Tbilisi, Georgia) is a Georgian writer and director.

Biography

Nana Ekvtimishvili studied philosophy at the Ivane Javakhishvili State University of Tbilisi. She studied screenwriting and dramaturgy at the Academy of Film and Television (HFF) in Potsdam-Babelsberg. Her stories were first published in 1999 in the Georgian literary magazine Arili in Georgia.

After writing prose and screenplays, in 2011 she directed the short film Deda / Waiting for Mum. 
In 2012, with Simon Groß, she completed her first feature film, Grdzeli Nateli Dgeebi (international title: In Bloom).

In Bloom premiered at the 63rd Berlin International Film Festival in 2013 and won the award of the International Confederation of Art Cinema - the CICAE Award. It also won numerous awards at other international film festivals, including in Hong Kong, Tokyo, Paris, Los Angeles and Sarajevo, and is an Oscar entry for 2014 for the Academy Award for Best Foreign Language Film from Georgia.

In 2013 Nana Ekvtimishvili together with Simon Gross was chosen among the ten most promising European directors from Varietyʼs Ten Directors to Watch at the 48th Karlovy Vary Film Festival.

At the Berlin International Film Festival in 2013, In Bloom was referred to as the birth of the new Georgian wave. In Hong Kong, the film was named as the spring of Georgian cinema. The International Federation of Film Critics (FIPRESCI) has called the film a sign of the rebirth of Georgian film.

In 2015 her first novel "The Pear Field" was published by Bakur Sulakauri Publishing in Georgia.

In 2018 "The Pear Field" was published in a German translation by Suhrkamp Publishing, Germany, as "Das Birnenfeld".

In 2020 "The Pear Field" was published in English translation by Peirene, UK.

Filmography
 My Happy Family (2017)
 In Bloom (2013)
 Waiting for Mum (2011)
 Lost Mainland (2008)
 Fata Morgana (2007)

Novels
The Pear Field (2015)

Literary awards 
2016 Saba Award for the debut for the novel "The Pear Field" 
2016 Ilia University Literary Award for the best Georgian novel of 2014-2015 for "The Pear Field" 
2016 Litera Award for the debut novel "The Pear Field"
Longlisted for the 2021 International Booker Prize for "The Pear Field" 
Finalist for the EBRD Literature Prize 2021

Cinema awards 
For In Bloom (2013)
 C.I.C.A.E. PRIZE of the International Confederation of Art House Cinemas, the 63rd Berlin Film Festival
 Young Cinema Competition prize the 37th  Hong Kong International Film Festival
 FIPRESCI Prize the 37th Hong Kong International Film Festival
 SKODA Film Award the 13th Festival of Central and Eastern Film GOEAST, Wiesbaden, Germany
 Blue Angel Award for Best Director the 21st Art Film Festival in Slovakia
 Grazia Magazine Award the  Paris Cinema International Film Festival
 Grand Prix at the 4th Voices  Volodga Independent Cinema from European Screen, Béla Tarr, Chairman of the Jury
 Five Lake Film Festival Young Cinema Award,  Germany
 The Heart of Sarajevo,  19th  Sarajevo Film Festival for Best Film
 Audience Award the Milano Film Festival
 Student Award the Milano Film Festival
 Grand Prix, Eurasia International Film Festival, Almaty, Kazakhstan. Jane Campion, Head of the Jury 
 Best Script Award, International Women's Film Festival in Salé (Film Femmes Méditerranée de Salé), Salé, Morocco
 Special Jury Prize, 42nd Festival du nouveau cinéma in  Montréal, Canada
 Best Film, Duhok International Film Festival, Iraq
 Special Commendation of Jury, Prix Europa
 Best Film Award,  Minsk International Film Festival, Belarus
 New Auteurs Special Award for Personal Storytelling, AFI Fest, Los Angeles, USA
 Golden Goat for the best full-length film for young people, International Young Audience Film Festival Ale Kino in Poznań, Poland 
 Golden Star for the Best Film, Cinedays Film Festival in  Skopje, Macedonia 
 Crystal Apricot for the Best Film, 4th Film Festival, Malatya, Turkey
 Grand Prize the 15th Tokyo Filmex, Mohsen Mahmalbah, Chairman of the Jury
 Best Georgian Film the 16th  Tbilisi International Film Festival, Tbilisi, Georgia
 Second Award for Feature Director  International Women's Film Festival, Rehovot, Israel
 The Bronze Djed, Luxor Egyptian and European Film Festival, Luxor, Egypt

For Waiting for Mum (2011-2012)
 Best short film Trieste Film Festival, Italy
 Special Mention Tbilisi International Film Festival, Georgia

References

External links

1978 births
Living people
Tbilisi State University alumni
Writers from Tbilisi
21st-century writers from Georgia (country)
20th-century women writers from Georgia (country)